Sir Ivison Stevenson Macadam  (18 July 1894 – 22 December 1974) was the first Director-General of the Royal Institute of International Affairs (Chatham House), and the founding President of the National Union of Students.

He was also the Editor and Chairman of the Advisory Board of the Annual Register of World Events; a longtime member of the editorial board of the Round Table and sat on the governing bodies of King’s College, London and other organisations.

Early life
Born 18 July 1894 at Slioch, Lady Road, Edinburgh, he was the second son of Colonel William Ivison Macadam, (1856–1902), and Sarah Maconochie MacDonald (1855–1941). He was the grandson of Stevenson Macadam, (1829-1901).

Educated at Melville College, Edinburgh, he was the second King's Scout to be invested in Scotland, and the first Silver Wolf Scout in Scotland, awarded for "services of the most exceptional character by gift of the Chief Scout". In both cases he was invested by Chief Scout and founder Sir Robert Baden-Powell.

World War One
He served in World War I, attached to the City of Edinburgh (Fortress) Royal Engineers. He was the youngest major in the British Army as Officer Commanding Royal Engineers, Archangel, North Russian Expeditionary Force, the ill-fated Allied military campaign 1918–1919 following the armistice with Germany, and the final major military action of WWI (Mentioned in dispatches [MID] thrice). He was awarded the OBE in 1919 at the age of 24 for his service there.

University education

Ivison, like many of his generation who served in World War I, attended university at a later age than normal after his wartime service. He studied at King's College London and Christ's College, Cambridge.

National Union of Students

He was the founder president of the National Union of Students, being elected their first president in 1922 when the Inter-Varsity Association and the International Students Bureau merged at a joint meeting held at the University of London. He was the then president of King's College Union Society.

After his experience in the First World War in an address to the British Association for the Advancement of Science he stated his vision of the role that the NUS would play. The Union is in no way a propagandist organisation, it is an association of students for the furtherance of students’ interests. But spirit of service permeates the movement and no one can fail to see how direct a bearing this national and international student co-operation must have on the great and pressing problems of reconstruction in Europe. If students are co-operating today surely there is hope for tomorrow.

The NUS's founding constitution stipulated that it must operate as a non-political and non-religious student organisation as the factional differences among nations were felt to have led to the recent world conflict. The non-political stipulation was dropped in 1969.

From its outset the NUS founders were also noteworthy in ensuring that women were involved at its highest levels through a constitutional requirement.

Macadam was involved in the formation Confédération Internationale des Étudiants (International Confederation of Students) bringing together student bodies from the original member countries of the League of Nations, including the US, and subsequently others. The CIE inaugural conference was held in Prague in 1921. He chaired until 1929 the CIE's commission responsible for International Relations and Travel. 

He stepped down as the NUS President in December 1922 to serve as Honorary Organising Secretary, which became in effect their senior executive  until 1929. While still at Cambridge, he was able to obtain the financing for a permanent headquarters for the NUS at Endsleigh Street, London, W.C.1.(opened in 1925). In 1927 Macadam spearheaded a successful fundraising appeal to endow the Union and place it on a sound financial footing. He was one of the original trustees of the National Union of Students and remained one until the end of his life.
  
The main students' union building and Faculty of Engineering at King's College's Strand campus is named the Macadam Building in his honour (opened 1975).

In 2004, KCLSU President Michael Champion instituted the Macadam Cup, a day of sporting excellence between medical and non-medical students at the College.
 
The new NUS National Headquarters was named Macadam House in 2013 at 275 Gray’s Inn Road, London, WC1X 8QB.

Royal Institute of International Affairs (Chatham House)

He was the first Secretary and Director-General of the Royal Institute of International Affairs serving as its chief executive between 1929 and 1955 based at Chatham House, 10 St. James's Square, London, S.W.1. 

A London County Council plaque on Number 10 states "Here lived Three Prime Ministers WILLIAM PITT Earl of Chatham 1708–1778 Edward Geoffrey Stanley EARL OF DERBY 1799–1869 William Ewart GLADSTONE 1809–1898". The Grade I listed building designed by Henry Flitcroft in 1730s was named on its gifting to the Institute after the first of these three Prime Ministers (Pitt the Elder) as Chatham House. Macadam oversaw the growth of the Institute from William Pitt's former Cabinet Room where as Prime Minister Pitt had presided over his Cabinet overlooking St. James's Square located above the entrance hall. 

To enable the Institute to increase the breadth and range of its activities, Macadam steadily expanded office and meeting space for the Institute by acquiring the freehold properties adjoining 10, St James Square (Chatham House).

Macadam was responsible for numerous international conferences around the world. He organised the first Commonwealth Relations Conference at Hart House, University of Toronto, Canada in 1933 (the first Commonwealth conference per se), followed by others at Lapstone near Sydney, Australia in 1938, at Chatham House, London in 1945, at Lucknow, India  in  1950., and at Lahore, Pakistan in 1954  Also various Institute of Pacific Relations Conferences, including that at Banff, Canada 1933. He was a participant in the Congress of Europe at The Hague, Netherlands in 1948.

He travelled to the British Dominions and helped the independent establishment of the various Commonwealth Institutes of International Affairs or where such bodies had earlier been established in both Australia and Canada to generate financial support from benefactors in order that they could have their own full-time secretariats. The Canadian Institute of International Affairs funding 1932 (now known as the Canadian International Council); the Australian funding 1934. The formation of the Institutes in New Zealand 1934; in South Africa 1934; in Indian 1936; in Pakistan 1947.

At Chatham House he is remembered for his Scottish drive and application ... He organised persons, events and work with equal stern objectivity. The Times, 24 December 1974
He was the institute’s chief executive for a period of 25 years during which it grew from a promising pioneering experiment into a well established and internationally respected centre for the study and discussion of world affairs.
When asked who founded Chatham House, Ivison would reply with a list of distinguished people, among whom Lionel Curtis took pride of place, and would emphasise the great amount of time that they devoted in shaping the institute’s policy in the early days. This no doubt was true, but it was Ivison who had to carry their ideas into practice, raise the money and recruit the staff.

He was a gifted promoter of Chatham House and its objectives, obtaining endowments in Britain and the Commonwealth and also gaining the support of the great American foundations, Carnegie, Rockefeller and later Ford. In this important American connection he was greatly helped by his American wife, Caroline, whose numerous friends in her own country opened many doors. The Times, 31 December 1974

 …he was a most efficient organiser, but an organiser not only of administration and action but also of men and women, who worked with him and for him as loyally as he worked for their common enterprise. By profession an engineer, by circumstance of war a soldier, he brought to his life’s work an engineer's concern for structure, a soldier's care for discipline with comradeship. Straightforward, without airs, he was essentially a practical man, who saw what needed to be done and did it, or saw that it was done. The Times, 6 January 1974.

Ministry of Information

He was Assistant Director General and Assistant Secretary to the Ministry of Information during World War II between 1939 – 41.

After his unpublicised pre-war  and then public wartime role in establishing the Ministry, he returned to the Royal Institute in March 1941 to continue its war work and oversee the post-war international reconstruction planning there.

The Annual Register of World Events

He was the Editor and the Chairman of the Advisory Board of The Annual Register of World Events for the years 1947–72, the world’s oldest annual reference book founded by Edmund Burke. He put the Annual Register on a sound financial footing and strengthened its worldwide reputation by bringing in a wide range of specialist contributors. Sales expanded considerably, particularly in the United States.  The Times, 24 December 1974

The Round Table

He was a member (1930–1974) of the editorial body (the Moot) of The Round Table: A quarterly Review of the Politics of the British Commonwealth as it was known at the time  (now The Round Table:The Commonwealth Journal of International Affairs). Britain’s oldest international journal. He served as the Round Table's Honorary Secretary in the postwar years.

King's College London

He was elected a Fellow of King's College London in 1939, and served as a member of the King's College Council 1957–74; its Delegacy 1960–74; a member of its Finance Committee, and on many special sub-committees both to the Delegacy and Council and Vice-Chairman 1971–74. On his election Macadam preposed that two students nominated by their peers sit on the governing body. This was adopted and King's was one of the first universities to follow this practise.
 
On his retirement as Vice-Chairman in 1974 the Delegacy minutes  of 15 January 1974 recorded his service to King's: In 1919, at the age of 25, Ivison Macadam entered the Faculty of Engineering at King’s College as a student. With a distinguished war service from 1914–19, including command of the Royal Engineers in the Archangel Expeditionary Force, he brought to College the experience and maturity which characterised many young ex-servicemen of both world wars. At King’s these qualities were quickly recognised by his election as President of the Union Society, and in a wider context of student life when he became the Founder President, and later Trustee of the National Union of Students.

After taking his degree he remained an unfailing supporter of all College activities during the difficult years of the thirties, and in 1939 was elected a Fellow. Knighted in 1955 Sir Ivison was appointed a member of the Council in 1957 and three years later he became a member of the Delegacy. Since then he has served as its Vice-Chairman, as a member of its Finance Committee, and on many special sub-committees both of the Delegacy and Council.

A close association of fifty-five years with one’s own College is a rare achievement. When that half century has been notable for constant devotion to its interests, based on both understanding and affection, the achievement is doubly rare.

In return Sir Ivison has evoked the affection he has given. At all meetings of both governing bodies and as chairman of sub-committees his advice has been sought and valued. His firm kindly manner, his robust presence and his Scottish clarity combined to make him one of the most permanent and respected figures in College life.

His resignation from the Delegacy is received both with a sense of severe loss and a sense of deep gratitude.

Royal service

He was a founding member of the Council, King George’s Jubilee Trust (for youth) on which he served from 1935–74, first under the Chairmanship of the Prince of Wales, until he ascended to the throne as Edward VIII; then under the chairmanship of Duke of York, until he ascended to the throne on the abdication of his brother as George VI and then under the chairmanship of the King's brother, Prince Henry, Duke of Gloucester, under whom he served as Vice-Chairman (1972–74), when the Duke was suffering from ill health, until Prince Charles had finished his naval service and was able to take over as Chairman. It is now run under the umbrella of The Prince's Trust under the Chairmanship of the Prince of Wales.

Macadam was responsible for devising the concept of, creating, editing and organising the printing and distribution of the official royal programs to be published under the auspices of the King George’s Jubilee Trust.

The programs published the details of the processions and order of service for King George V and Queen Mary’s Jubilee, 1935; The Coronation of their Majesties King George VI and Queen Elizabeth, 1937; The wedding of the Princess Elizabeth and Lt. Philip Mountbatten, RN, 1947; The Coronation of Queen Elizabeth II, 1953; the wedding of the Princess Margaret and Anthony Armstrong-Jones,1960 and the wedding of the Princess Alexandra of Kent and Angus Ogilvy, 1963.

They were sold on behalf of King George’s Jubilee Trust mainly along the parade routes on the day of the event by the Boy Scouts but also prior to it in newsagents and bookshops. The substantial additional funds thus raised helped support the work of King George's Jubilee Trust in aiding young people, youth organisations and youth projects.

Other roles
Other voluntary roles included:
Chairman 1960–72 (later Deputy President) of the Victoria League for Commonwealth Friendship
Commander, County of Norfolk St. John Ambulance Brigade 1958–1972; President 1972–74
Chairman of the Board of Governors, Runton Hill School 1960–72

Personal life

When Macadam was only seven, his father was shot and killed by a mentally disturbed gunman in an Edinburgh tragedy in 1902.

In 1938 he married, Caroline Ladd Corbett, who was born and raised in Portland, Oregon USA (Born 20 September 1910 at Portland, Multnomah Co. Died on 28 August 1989 in East Runton, Norfolk). Her parents were Elliott Ruggles Corbett (1884–1963) and Alta Rittenhouse Smith (1886–1976). Caroline was the great-granddaughter of two of Portland's pioneers (Henry W. Corbett and William S. Ladd). Before her marriage, she was Assistant to the US Secretary of State, Henry L. Stimson, and the couple met at the IPR's international conference that Macadam had arranged at Banff, Canada in 1933.

After their marriage, she was of invaluable support to her husband in his professional life and in assisting him to raise the substantial funding required for the operations of the RIIA. She was later Chairman of the Eastern Counties Women’s Conservative Associations.

The couple had four children: Helen Ivison Macadam (who married 1. Ian Wightwick M.C., 2. The Rev. Roger Taylor), William Ivison Macadam, Elliott Corbett Macadam and Caroline Alta Macadam (who is married to Francesco Colacicchi and writes under the name of Alta Macadam). The couple lived in London and at Runton Old Hall, East Runton, Norfolk. Macadam was a keen sportsman, shot and fly fisherman.

Honours and decorations

 Officer of the Order of the British Empire (OBE), 1919 – Military Division

 Victory Medal (United Kingdom) with oak leaf MID (Mentioned in dispatches thrice), 1919
 Order of Saint Anna (Russian Order), 2nd class with swords (for bravery in battle), 1919
 British War Medal, 1920
 Territorial Force War Medal, 1920  
 Commander of the Order of the British Empire (CBE), 1935 – Civil Division
 King George V Silver Jubilee Medal, 1935
 Member of the Royal Victorian Order (MVO), 1937
 King George VI Coronation Medal, 1937
 Defence Medal (United Kingdom), 1945
 Commander of the Royal Victorian Order (CVO), 1953
 Queen Elizabeth II Coronation Medal, 1953
 Knight Bachelor, (Kt.) 1955
 Commander of the Order of St. John (CStJ), c.1965
 Knight Commander of the Royal Victorian Order (KCVO), 1974
 Fellow of King's College, London (FKC), 1939
 Fellow of the Royal Society of Edinburgh (FRSE), 1945
 Member of the Institution of Mechanical Engineers (MIMechE)

Death

He died on 22 December 1974, at his London home at 16 Upper Belgrave Street, London.

He is buried with his wife next to his father in Portobello Cemetery in Edinburgh. 

The inscription reads: SIR IVISON STEVENSON MACADAM, Knight Commander of the Royal Victorian Order,  Knight Bachelor, CBE, OBE (military), FRSE, MImechE. Of Runton Old Hall Norfolk. Youngest 
Son of Col. W. Ivison Macadam.
  
— 1894–1974 —
  
Founder President of the National Union of Students. Director General of The Royal Institute of International Affairs (Chatham House). Editor of the Annual Register. Fellow of King’s College London. Vice Chairman 
of King George’s Jubillee Trust. Major Royal Engineers City of Edinburgh (Fortress) & Archangel 1919. Farmer and Sportsman.

And his wife’s inscription immediately below reads:
CAROLINE LADD CORBETT
1910 – 1989
Eldest child of Elliott R and Alta 
Corbett of Portland Oregon.
Devoted Wife and Loving Mother.

The grave lies midway along the original eastern path (before the eastern extension) in Portebello Cemetery beside that of his father Col. William Ivison Macadam and near that of his grandfather Stevenson Macadam around 20m to the north.

His grave memorial was designed and lettering was carved by Michael Harvey MBE. Lady Macadam’s inscription below her husband's was by Dick Reid OBE.

References

External links 
 National Union of Students
 History of the NUS
 King's College London Students' Union
 Small biography

1894 births
1974 deaths
Alumni of King's College London
Alumni of Christ's College, Cambridge
British Army personnel of World War I
Commanders of the Order of the British Empire
Fellows of the Royal Society of Edinburgh
Fellows of King's College London
Knights Bachelor
Knights Commander of the Royal Victorian Order
Royal Engineers officers
British mechanical engineers
People from Edinburgh
People educated at Stewart's Melville College
Commanders of the Order of St John
Council and directors of Chatham House
People from North Norfolk (district)
East Runton
British Army personnel of the Russian Civil War